Amblesthidopsis is a monotypic beetle genus in the family Cerambycidae described by Per Olof Christopher Aurivillius in 1921. Its only species, Amblesthidopsis areolata, was described by the same author in the same year.

References

Apomecynini
Beetles described in 1921
Monotypic Cerambycidae genera